Sause is a Papuan language spoken in Indonesia, to the southwest of Sentani. Its classification is uncertain, but it appears to be related to Kapauri and the Tor languages.

Sause is spoken in Ures, Mubararon, Sause-Bokoko, Witti-Yadow, Lidya, and Puaral villages.

References

Languages of western New Guinea
Kapauri–Sause languages
Language isolates of New Guinea